The Variations and Fugue on a Theme by Mozart, Op. 132, is a set of variations for orchestra composed in 1914 by Max Reger; the composer conducted the premiere in Berlin on 5 February 1915. He later produced a version for two pianos, Op. 132a, where the Variation 8 ("Moderato") is completely different.

Description
The theme is drawn from the first movement of Wolfgang Amadeus Mozart's Piano Sonata in A, K. 331, and is first presented by the oboe and two clarinets before being repeated by strings. Its second part appears again in the oboe and clarinet supported by high strings, and then is again repeated by the string section. Eight variations follow; then the fugue, in which the subject appears first in first violins before being answered after eight bars by the second violins. The piece concludes with a final, forceful statement of the theme by trumpets.

Movements
The work, which takes about 33 minutes to perform, consists of the following movements:

It is scored for piccolo flute, two concert flutes, two oboes, two clarinets, two bassoons, four French horns, two trumpets, timpani, harp, string section.

Critical reaction
This remains the composer's most popular and most-recorded orchestral work, although in recent decades it has largely disappeared from the concert hall. It has obvious antecedents in Johannes Brahms' Variations on a Theme by Haydn both in terms of the inspiration theme (both draw from a simple melodic phrase) and the subsequent style of variation. Many critics, however, have remained lukewarm to the piece as little more than Brahmsian pastiche.

See also
 List of variations on a theme by another composer

References
Notes

Sources
David Ewen, Encyclopedia of Concert Music. New York; Hill and Wang, 1959.

External links

1914 compositions
Mozart
Compositions by Max Reger
Compositions for symphony orchestra
Compositions for two pianos
Composer tributes (classical music)